is an open world action role-playing game developed by CyberConnect2 and published by Bandai Namco Entertainment, based on the Dragon Ball franchise. It was released for PlayStation 4, Xbox One and Windows in January 2020, for Nintendo Switch in September 2021, and for Stadia in October 2021, and for PlayStation 5 in January 2023. The Xbox Series X/S version was also created at the same time, but release was delayed to February 2023 to fix a game-breaking bug. The game follows the main protagonist Goku and the Z-Fighters throughout the events of the Dragon Ball Z anime, including anime-original storylines and moments.

The game received generally mixed reviews upon release, and has sold over  copies worldwide .

Gameplay
Kakarot is primarily an action role-playing game with fighting game elements. The player can battle opponents and do activities like fishing, collecting Z orbs, eating, driving in a hover car, training, and putting characters in soul emblems. The game's plot follows the progression of the anime series, as the player interacts with the surrounding world as the different playable characters. Players can explore the world and complete side quests to progress the story. The game is broken up into four storylines: the Saiyan Saga, the Frieza Saga, the Cell Saga (where the player acquires their hover car), and the Buu Saga.

Bonus storylines can be purchased as downloadable content; including a retelling of the Battle of Gods and the Resurrection 'F' storylines seen in Dragon Ball Super. A DLC original storyline set after the events of Dragon Ball Z: The History of Trunks, featuring Future Trunks' confrontation with Babidi to prevent Majin Buu's awakening (a scenario briefly covered in both the Super Anime and Manga), was released on June 11, 2021.

There are seven playable characters in Dragon Ball Z: Kakarot that the player will guide throughout the story. These include Goku, Vegeta, Gohan, Piccolo, Future Trunks, Gotenks, and Vegito. As the player progresses through the game, they will unlock new characters to play.

In addition to the playable characters, the player is able to select two supporting characters to aid in their battle each with their own special moves. These characters include Krillin, Yamcha, Tien Shinhan, Chiaotzu, Android 18, Goten, and Kid Trunks.

The bosses that appear in-game include Raditz, Nappa, Vegeta, Cui, Dodoria, Zarbon, Ginyu Force, Frieza, Android 19, Android 20, Android 18, Android 17, Cell, Cell Jr., Pui Pui, Yakon, Dabura, Majin Vegeta, Majin Buu, Super Buu, Kid Buu, Beerus and Mira. , an original character designed by Dragon Ball creator Akira Toriyama for the game, also appears as a boss.

Development
The game was announced in January 2019 via a trailer during Dragon Ball FighterZ World Tour Finals under the working title Dragon Ball Game: Project Z. Described as an action role-playing game, the game was said to be in development by CyberConnect2, known for their work on Asura's Wrath and Naruto Ultimate Ninja series, for PlayStation 4, Xbox One, and PC through Steam. Although initially targeting 2019 release, the final title, Dragon Ball Z: Kakarot, and the early 2020 release window were announced during Microsoft's 2019 E3 conference.

The game was released for PlayStation 4 and Xbox One consoles in Japan on January 16, and for all platforms in the west one day later on January 17, 2020. The Nintendo Switch version of the game was announced in June 2021, and released on September 24, 2021. It includes the base game and "A New Power Awakens" DLC. Versions for PlayStation 5 and Xbox Series X/S were announced in September 2022, set to launch in 2023. While the former saw a release on January 12 in Japan, and January 13 worldwide, the launch of Xbox Series X/S upgrade and its coinciding DLC was postponed to February 3 due to a game-breaking technical issue where the save data from the Xbox One version would not readily work with the Series XS version without converting it from the original version.

Downloadable content
When the game launched in January 2020, there was an option of buying an extra "season pass" which initially gave only a "Steaming-Hot Grilled Fish cooking item" but which promised access to an eventual "2 original episodes and one new story".

In April 2020, Bandai Namco Entertainment announced the first downloable content (DLC) for the game titled A New Power Awakens - Part 1, with a scheduled release date of April 28. The DLC introduces transformations and characters seen in Dragon Ball Z: Battle of Gods and covers the events of the movie.

The second DLC, titled A New Power Awakens Part 2, introduces a new mode where players battle 1000 enemies, including Golden Frieza, and is based on the events of Dragon Ball Z: Resurrection 'F'.

A free update was released on the October 27, 2020 called Dragon Ball Card Warriors. An online card battle game that allows to play cards battles with people around the world. There will be a monthly event on the new card game.

A new DLC storyline was announced to be released in Summer 2021. The DLC covers Future Trunks' timeline seen in Dragon Ball Z: The History of Trunks as well as an extra saga featuring Babidi and Dabura, briefly covered in Dragon Ball Z: Shin Budokai - Another Road and the manga version of Dragon Ball Super. It was released 10 June 2021 as Trunks: The Warrior of Hope.

During Tokyo Game Show 2022, a second season pass with three DLCs was announced for the game along with a free next-gen update for PS5 and Xbox Series X/S users. The first DLC covers the events of Dragon Ball Z: Bardock – The Father of Goku along with a side story focusing on an infant Vegeta, and is titled Bardock: Alone Against Fate. The second was announced to be covering the Piccolo Jr. saga of the original Dragon Ball anime and is titled Chaos at the World Tournament. The final DLC for this season pass has yet to be unannounced.

Reception

Kakarot received "mixed or average" reviews for the Windows, PlayStation 4, and Xbox One versions and "generally favorable" reviews for the Switch and PlayStation 5 versions according to review aggregator Metacritic. IGN Michael Saltzman gave Kakarot a score of 7, praising its combat and story presentation, but criticized its poor RPG elements.

Kakarot was awarded 7/10 in GameSpot review, with Heidi Kemps saying that its "modern, semi-open approach to telling the saga of DBZ - despite some minor issues - is a good one." Kemps concluded that "[i]f you're looking for an enjoyable way to see the life and times of adult Goku through a new perspective, Dragon Ball Z: Kakarot will grant your wish."

The game was the second best-selling game during its first week on sale in Japan, with 89,537 copies being sold, behind Yakuza: Like a Dragon. In the United Kingdom, Kakarot debuted at number one on the sales chart.

In a conference call, Bandai Namco revealed that the game sold over 1.5 million copies worldwide in its first week release, rendering it a commercial success. , the game has sold over  copies worldwide, combining total shipments and digital sales. As of December 2021, the game has sold over 4.5 million copies worldwide.

Dragon Ball Z: Kakarot was the best-selling game of January 2020 in the United States, and had the third highest-selling launch month for a game in the Dragon Ball franchise, behind Dragon Ball FighterZ and Dragon Ball Z: Budokai.

References

External links
 
  

2020 video games
Action role-playing video games
Bandai Namco games
CyberConnect2 games
Open-world video games
Kakarot
Nintendo Switch games
PlayStation 4 games
PlayStation 5 games
Video games developed in Japan
Video games with downloadable content
Windows games
Xbox One games
Xbox Series X and Series S games
Unreal Engine games
Single-player video games
Stadia games